King Abdullah University of Science and Technology (KAUST) is a private research university located in Thuwal, Saudi Arabia. Founded in 2009, the university provides research and graduate training programs in English as the official language of instruction.

KAUST is the first mixed-gender university campus in Saudi Arabia. In 2013, the university was among the 500 fastest growing research and citation records in the world. In the 2016 Nature Index Rising Stars, the university ranked 19th in the world of the fastest rising universities for high quality research output. In 2019 KAUST is ranked 8th fastest rising young universities (aged 50 and under) for their research output since 2015, as measured by fractional count (FC).

History 
In 2006, Ali Al-Naimi chaired a Saudi Aramco team to undertake the building and planning of the academics.  Nadhmi Al-Nasr was chosen to lead the project.  They employed the Washington Advisory Group's Frank H. T. Rhodes and Frank Press to design the academic structure, SRI International to develop the four research institutes, and the architectural firm of HOK for the campus master plan, which included wind towers and solar panels.  The location of the campus at Thuwal included 16.4 sq km on land and 19.6 sq km of marine sanctuary offshore.  Ground breaking took place in Oct. 2007, and 178 scholarships were awarded in Jan. 2008.

KAUST officially opened on September 23, 2009 at an inauguration ceremony, where King Abdullah Bin Abdulaziz Al Saud gave a speech where he stated that places like the University that "embrace all people are the first line of defence against extremists". The University initially received a $10 billion endowment. Upon opening, the University admitted 400 students from over 60 countries and 70 faculty. The campus is home to Shaheen, Asia's fastest supercomputer at the time of its commissioning.

in September 2018, KAUST signed a 5 year R&D partnership agreement with McLaren.

Campus

Description 

KAUST is the first mixed-gender university campus in Saudi Arabia. Saudi authorities hope the mixed-gender center will help modernize the Kingdom's deeply conservative society. The religious police do not operate on-site. Women are allowed to mix freely with men  and they are not required to wear veils in the coeducational classes.

KAUST was Saudi Arabia's first LEED certified project and is the world's largest LEED Platinum campus. Designed by international architecture firm Hellmuth, Obata and Kassabaum, it was also chosen by the American Institute of Architects (AIA) Committee on the Environment (COTE) as one of the 2010 Top Ten Green Projects. The university library received the 2011 AIA/ALA Library Building Award for accomplishments in library architecture.

Research 

KAUST organizes its research teams across three academic disciplines, 12 research centers and individual faculty labs. KAUST focuses its research around the areas of food and health, water, energy, environment and the digital domain.

Academic divisions

Biological and Environmental Science and Engineering Division 
Research in the Biological and Environmental Science and Engineering Division (BESE) is organized around six focal areas: environmental systems; epigenetics; functional biology; genomics; imaging/structural biology; and marine science.

Computer, Electrical and Mathematical Sciences and Engineering Division 
Research in the Computer, Electrical and Mathematical Sciences and Engineering Division (CEMSE) is clustered into four main areas:
 Electrical engineering, including the development of communication networks; CMOS integrated circuits; electronic and optics/photonics devices; micro-electro-mechanical systems; various types of sensors, measurement and detection devices; as well as functional- and nano-materials.
 Mathematical analysis, including modeling and simulations with applications to physical, chemical, biological and environmental processes; materials science; oil exploration and reservoir management.
 Computer science and big data, including bioinformatics; and visual and extreme computing.
 Statistics and data science, including climate science, environmental statistics, and biostatistics.

Physical Sciences and Engineering Division 
Research in the Physical Sciences and Engineering Division (PSE) includes areas such as theoretical physics and physical chemistry; catalysis and bioengineering; polymers and composites; energy production, storage and conversion; water purification and environmental protection; novel materials, nanodevices and systems; sensors and smart devices for the detection of pollutants and the purification of air, water, and food; earth sciences, mechanics and geomechanics; oil exploration and recovery; and CO2 sequestration.

Research centers 
Research in the Academic Divisions is driven by independent faculty labs and 12 Research Centers.

Distinguished professors 
 Mohamed-Slim Alouini - Professor of Electrical and Computer Engineering
 Jean-Marie Basset - French chemist, Professor of Chemical Science at KAUST.
 Jean Fréchet - French-American chemist, Professor of Chemical Science and Senior Vice-President for Research, Innovation and Economic Development.
 Nina Federoff - American biologist, Professor Emerita.
 Marc G. Genton - Professor of Statistics at KAUST
 Takashi Gojobori - Japanese molecular biologist, Professor of Bioscience and Associate Director of the Computational Bioscience Research Center.
 David E. Keyes - Professor of Applied Mathematics and Computational Science, Director of the Extreme Computing Research Center, and Senior Associate to the President

Postgraduate programs

Master's 
The Master of Science (M.S.) program at KAUST can be taken in one of the 16 available disciplines. It is expected that students complete the degree in 18 months and may be completed with or without a thesis component.
Admission to the M.S. program requires the satisfactory completion of an undergraduate science degree in a relevant or related area, such as engineering, mathematics or the physical, chemical and biological sciences.

Doctor of Philosophy 
The Doctor of Philosophy (Ph.D.) program at KAUST can be taken in one of the 16 available disciplines. It typically takes three to four years to complete. 
Admission to the Ph.D. program requires the satisfactory completion of a master's degree in science in a relevant or related area, such as engineering, mathematics or the physical, chemical and biological sciences.

M.S. / Ph.D. Program
The M.S./Ph.D. program allows students to apply for the Ph.D. program after completing a bachelor’s degree. The program typically takes four to five years to complete.

Postgraduate Diploma 
KAUST offers a one year Postgraduate Diploma in Digital Industrial Design, Physical Science and Engineering, and Bioscience. Each program is made up of soft skill, experimental, theoretical and entrepreneurship courses as well as a capstone experience.

Internship programs

Visiting Student Research Program 
The VSRP is a three to six month internship program available for 3rd/4th year undergraduate or master's students. During the program, students will work under the guidance of KAUST faculty mentors on a current research project. Students accepted into the program receive a monthly stiped as well as having their accommodation, health insurance and travel costs covered.

Visiting Student Program 
The Visiting Student Program (VS) is a flexible program allowing 3rd/4th year undergraduate or master's students to work directly with KAUST faculty members. Its length can range from a few days to several months. Students accepted into the program normally receive a monthly stiped as well as having their accommodation, health insurance and travel costs covered.

Program disciplines  
 Applied Mathematics and Computational Science
 Applied Physics
 Bioengineering
 Bioscience
 Chemical Engineering
 Chemistry
 Computer Science
 Earth Science and Engineering
 Electrical and Computer Engineering
 Energy Resources and Petroleum Engineering
 Environmental Science and Engineering
 Marine Science
 Material Science and Engineering
 Mechanical Engineering
 Plant Science
 Statistics

Admissions 

While there is no minimum academic entry requirement, those admitted typically have strong grade profiles and clear research interests. Applicants are also required to meet English language requirements for entry unless they qualify for an exemption.

Fellowship 

Every student who is admitted receives the KAUST Fellowship. This fellowship covers the cost of a student’s tuition fees, accommodation, health insurance, and relocation costs as well as giving the student a monthly stipend.

See also

 House of Wisdom
 Education in Saudi Arabia
 Shaheen (supercomputer)
 List of things named after Saudi Kings

References

 
Universities and colleges in Saudi Arabia
2009 establishments in Saudi Arabia
Educational institutions established in 2009
English as a global language
Private universities and colleges in Saudi Arabia
Science and technology in Saudi Arabia
Scientific organisations based in Saudi Arabia
World Digital Library partners
Mecca Province
Postgraduate schools